David Laliberté (born March 17, 1986) is a Canadian former professional ice hockey player. He played 11 games in the National Hockey League (NHL) while a member of the Philadelphia Flyers during the 2009–10 season.

Playing career
Laliberté started his playing career after being drafted 3rd overall in the Quebec Major Junior Hockey League (QMJHL) Entry Draft by the Montreal Rocket. He quickly became a top player for the team as one of their best offensive forecheckers. After just two years with the Rocket, who relocated to Charlottetown, Prince Edward Island during his time with the club, he was drafted in the fourth round, 124th overall, by the Philadelphia Flyers in the 2004 NHL Entry Draft.

During the 2004–05 season, Laliberté sustained an inoperable injury to a nerve in his back, which sent pain shooting down his leg, making it difficult for him to walk. The injury caused him to miss a year of playing and doctors said that he would have to tolerate some pain for the rest of his life. He did not return from the injury until December 2005 of the following season.  He scored a hat-trick in his first game back and was named team captain, helping lead the underachieving P.E.I. Rocket back into the playoffs after failing to qualify the previous season. Laliberté completed his major junior career in 2006–07 with a QMJHL career-high 50 goals and 89 points in 68 games.

Following the season, Laliberté was technically an unrestricted free agent after not being signed by the Flyers within two years of being drafted, but he signed a three-year, entry level contract with the team on May 17, 2007. Laliberté split the 2007–08 season between the Flyers' minor league affiliates, the Philadelphia Phantoms of the AHL and the Wheeling Nailers of the ECHL, before spending the entire 2008–09 season with the Phantoms.  About a month into the 2009–10 season, Laliberté was called up by the Flyers and scored his first NHL goal and assist against goaltender Michael Leighton of the Carolina Hurricanes in his debut on October 31, 2009, in a 6–1 win.

On November 21, 2010, Laliberté was traded with Patrick Maroon to the Anaheim Ducks in return for forward Rob Bordson and defenceman Danny Syvret. After 29 games with the Ducks AHL affiliate, the Syracuse Crunch, Laliberte joined his third NHL organization for the season when he was dealt by the Ducks, along with Stefan Chaput, to the Boston Bruins for Brian McGrattan and Sean Zimmerman on February 27, 2011.

In July 2011, Laliberté signed a contract with German team Grizzly Adams Wolfsburg of the Deutsche Eishockey Liga, Germany's major hockey league. In 50 games with Grizzly Adams in 2011–12, Laliberte contributed with 20 goals before suffering defeat in the Quarterfinals to end his tenure with Wolfsburg.

In January 2014, he joined Italian based club, HC Bolzano, to begin play in the Austrian Hockey League. In the midst of his second season with Slovak based club, HK Nitra, Laliberté signalled an immediate end to his professional career, citing a serious back injury on November 25, 2016.

Career statistics

Awards and honours

References

External links
 

1986 births
Living people
Adirondack Phantoms players
Bolzano HC players
Canadian ice hockey right wingers
Grizzlys Wolfsburg players
French Quebecers
Gwinnett Gladiators players
Lørenskog IK players
HC Merano players
Montreal Rocket players
HK Nitra players
P.E.I. Rocket players
People from Saint-Jean-sur-Richelieu
Philadelphia Flyers draft picks
Philadelphia Flyers players
Philadelphia Phantoms players
Providence Bruins players
Syracuse Crunch players
Trenton Titans players
Wheeling Nailers players
Canadian expatriate ice hockey players in Slovakia
Canadian expatriate ice hockey players in Norway
Canadian expatriate ice hockey players in Italy
Canadian expatriate ice hockey players in Germany
Canadian expatriate ice hockey players in the United States